Da'Shawn Hand (born November 14, 1995) is an American football defensive end for the Tennessee Titans of the National Football League (NFL). He played college football at Alabama.

Early years 
Hand was born in Philadelphia, Pennsylvania, fathered by Sharif Hand, who was a junior in high school when Da'Shawn was born. Hand's uncle, Damone Boone, was a Parade All-American running back at West Springfield in Virginia in the mid-1990s.

After moving to Woodbridge, Virginia, Hand attended Woodbridge High School, where he was a three-sport athlete in football, wrestling and track. In football, he was an All-State defensive lineman. In his junior year, Hand recorded 110 tackles, 16 sacks, 40 tackles for loss, two pass deflections, four forced fumbles, and three fumble recoveries. Woodbridge finished the season 6–5, losing 0–17 to Haymarket Battlefield in the first round of the VHSL playoffs. After his junior year, Hand was named Rivals.com Junior of the Year, an honor that comes along with being rated the No. 1 prospect of one's class entering senior season. Media attention steadily increased, and The Washington Post made Hand the subject of a documentary series named First and 17, which followed him both on and off the field, "giving an inside look at the challenges facing a top recruit juggling school, football and his senior year."

In addition to playing football, Hand also excelled in wrestling and track. He was a regional champion in Virginia wrestling. In track & field, he competed primarily as a thrower, but also spend some time as a sprinter during his final year in 2014. At the Runner Store City-County Championships, he earned a second-place finish in the shot put event, recording a career-best throw of 15.81 meters (51 ft, 9 in). He placed 11th in the discus at the Gojekian Twilight Classic, notching a top-throw of 35.66 meters (116 ft, 9 in). In sprints, he clocked a 12.24-second 100-meter dash time at the 2014 Garfield Meet, where he took 7th. He ran a 4.7-second 40-yard dash and had a 33-inch vertical jump.

Recruiting 
Hand was considered the nation's best recruit in the 2014 class by Rivals.com. In 2012, he was the Rivals High School Football Junior of the Year. With over 90 scholarship offers, Hand narrowed down his choice of college destination to three—Alabama, Florida, and Michigan—before the start of his senior season. On November 14, 2013, his eighteenth birthday, he committed to attend the University of Alabama. Eyeing a civil engineering major, Hand cited Alabama's civil engineering program as one of the key reasons he chose the Crimson Tide.

College career 
Hand attended Alabama from 2014–2017 under head coach Nick Saban. In his true freshman year at Alabama, Hand was a regular in the Crimson Tide defensive line rotation and played in nine games at defensive end. He started his college career with one solo tackle against West Virginia. Hand finished with seven tackles on the year, including four solo stops and two sacks (−10 yards). Hand started nine of the 11 games he played in 2017, missing time with a minor knee injury. He had 27 tackles, 3.5 tackles for loss, and three sacks in the season.

Collegiate statistics

Professional career

Detroit Lions
Hand was drafted by the Detroit Lions in the fourth round (114th overall) of the 2018 NFL Draft. He made his professional debut in the Lions' season opener against the New York Jets. In Week 4, against the Dallas Cowboys, he recorded his first professional sack. In the following game, he was able to record another sack in the victory against the Green Bay Packers. He was placed on injured reserve on December 18, 2018.

The 2019 season was an injury riddled sophomore season for Hand. He suffered an elbow injury early in training camp and missed the first six weeks of the regular season. He returned for two weeks, then suffered an ankle injury in Week 9 and missed the next three games. He returned in Week 13, but suffered a setback with the ankle injury and was placed on injured reserve on December 12, 2019.

In 2020, Hand was relegated to a backup role, playing in about 50% of the total defensive snaps while only starting one game of 10 games played. He missed three games early in the season with a groin injury, then suffered an ankle injury in Week 14. He was placed on injured reserve on December 19, 2020.

On September 2, 2021, Hand was placed on injured reserve. He was activated on October 30. He was placed back on injured reserve on November 23, ending his season. He was released on November 30.

Indianapolis Colts
On December 21, 2021, Hand was signed to the Indianapolis Colts practice squad. He was released on December 31.

Tennessee Titans
On January 5, 2022, Hand was signed to the Tennessee Titans practice squad. On February 15, 2022, Hand signed a reserve/future contract with the Titans. He was placed on injured reserve on September 13, 2022.

References

External links 

Detroit Lions bio
Alabama Crimson Tide bio

1995 births
Living people
Alabama Crimson Tide football players
American football defensive tackles
Detroit Lions players
Indianapolis Colts players
People from Woodbridge, Virginia
Players of American football from Philadelphia
Players of American football from Virginia
Sportspeople from the Washington metropolitan area
Tennessee Titans players